Jaime Rest (July 2, 1927 – November 8, 1979) was an Argentine translator, literary critic, writer and teacher.

See also
Argentine literature

1927 births
1979 deaths
University of Buenos Aires alumni
Argentine translators
Argentine literary critics
20th-century translators
20th-century Argentine male writers